Swiss Prime Site AG is one of the largest listed real estate companies in Europe. The fair value of the real estate under management is around CHF 20 billion. The portfolio of the company's own real estate has a value of around CHF 13 billion and consists primarily of commercial and retail properties in the most important Swiss metropolitan regions of the Central Plateau. In addition to the real estate investments, the Group companies Wincasa, Swiss Prime Site Solutions and Jelmoli make up the Services segment.

History 
The company was founded in 1999 by the pension funds of Credit Suisse and Siemens Switzerland and the then Winterthur Life (now Axa). Swiss Prime Site was listed on the SIX Swiss Exchange in April 2000. At the time, the real estate portfolio had a value of around CHF500 million.

In 2001, Swiss Prime Site bought a portfolio of office buildings from Swisscom. In 2003, it acquired the Frey Group and in 2004 Maag Holding AG. In 2009, the takeover of the stock listed Jelmoli Holding AG took place. In October 2012, Swiss Prime Site acquired Wincasa AG, a real estate service company in Switzerland, as well as the Tertianum Group. In 2019 Swiss Prime Site announced the sale of the Tertianum Group. At the end of 2021, Swiss Prime Site acquired the Akara Group to strengthen the Services segment.

Completed construction projects: Espace Tourbillon Genf, Basler Messeturm, Opus Zug, the PostFinance Arena and Schönburg in Bern YOND and Sihlcity in Zürich as well as the Prime Tower with the Clouds restaurant and its neighboring building. The Prime Tower on the Maag site in Zürich West, is with its total of 126 meters, one of the tallest office buildings in Switzerland.

Real estate services 
The business segment consists of the core business of real estate investments and Wincasa AG, a Swiss provider of real estate services. The investment focus in real estate is on investment in facilities, mainly with commercially used areas, as well as focus placed on project development.

Management 
The management consists of René Zahnd (CEO since 2016), Marcel Kucher (CFO since 2021), Anastasius Tschopp (CEO Swiss Prime Site Solutions since 2018), Nina Müller (CEO Jelmoli since 2021) and Oliver Hofmann (CEO of Wincasa since 2013).

References

External links 
 Official website

Companies listed on the SIX Swiss Exchange
Real estate companies of Switzerland
Real estate companies established in 1999
1999 establishments in Switzerland